The National Business Aviation Association (NBAA) is a non-profit, 501(c)(6) organization based in Washington, DC, United States. NBAA’s mission, according to the non-profit data and transparency organization GuideStar, is: “to foster an environment that allows business aviation to thrive in the United States and around the world.”

Overview 
As noted on NBAA’s website: “Founded in 1947, the National Business Aviation Association collects, interprets and disseminates operational and managerial data related to the safe, efficient and cost-effective use of business aircraft.” “The Association is the focal point for identifying and understanding advances in technology and procedures important to the business aviation community.”

Surpassing the 11,000-member mark in 2016, NBAA represents the business aviation industry’s access to airports and airspace. Other work performed by NBAA on behalf of the industry includes safety and security, international operations, and certification of new technologies. The association “provides more than 100 products and services to the business aviation community, including the NBAA Business Aviation Convention & Exhibition, the world’s largest civil aviation trade show.”

NBAA and public policy 
Organizations such as NBAA, which are set up as 501(c)(6) entities with the IRS “are not organized for profit and no part of the net earnings goes to the benefit of any private shareholder or individual.” Such an organization “may also perform some political activities. 501(c)(6) organizations are allowed to attempt to influence legislation that is related to the common business interests of its members.”

NBAA’s public policy initiatives in 2018 centered on the organization’s opposition to air traffic control privatization. The matter was debated in 2018 as part of the U.S. Federal Aviation Administration’s (FAA) congressional reauthorization process. Various proposals for extracting and privatizing air traffic control (ATC) were debated. NBAA’s opposition to ATC privatization was motivated by the potential lack of representation on the AANS board (the proposed directors who would oversee a privatized ATC system). “Critics say that, given where the members are drawn from, the board would end up controlled by airline-related interests. They worry that the focus would accordingly be on the major airline corridors, with rural airports and users becoming second-class (or maybe third- or fourth-class) citizens.” Ultimately, the FAA reauthorization was passed without including any ATC privatization measures.

Other public policy efforts of NBAA have focused on safety, security and tax policies related to business. In 2017, NBAA supported the passage in the U. S. House of Representatives of H.R. 3669 “Securing General Aviation and Commercial Charter Air Carrier Service Act'' which would, among other things, “Authorize the TSA to provide screening services to commercial charter operators in areas other than primary passenger terminals…”. The organization also supported tax rules in the 2017 Tax Cuts and Jobs Act for deduction of business aircraft costs in the first year (also known as “immediate expensing”).

NBAA has worked for many years to promote technologies, policies and procedures that ensure America’s aviation system remains the largest, best, safest and most diverse system in the world, and that includes support for the FAA’s ongoing rollout of next-generation, or ‘NextGen’ technologies, many of which have already been successfully implemented.”

No Plane No Gain and data about NBAA members/business aviation

NBAA jointly sponsors the No Plane No Gain advocacy campaign with the General Aviation Manufacturers Association. The website “provides data showing a multitude of ways the industry is an integral engine to the economy”.

An ongoing, multi-decade study by Harris Interactive found in 2009 “the use of business jets and other small aircraft is more about companies trying to gain efficiency and improve the bottom line than about providing a luxurious perk to those at the top of the corporate ladder.”

The most recent edition of the same study by Harris in 2018 found that:

 “Most users of business aviation are small companies employing 500 or fewer workers. Sixty-two percent of pilots and flight department leaders (identified as "pilots" for survey purposes) stated their companies utilize a single, turbine-powered aircraft.”
 “Many business aircraft are largely flown to towns with little or no airline service, with pilots reporting that, on average, 31.5 percent of their flights over the past year were to destinations lacking any scheduled airline service.” 
 “Scheduling flexibility remains a key driver for business aviation, with 51.6 of passengers stating that traveling on business aircraft enables them to keep business schedules that could not be met efficiently using the scheduled airlines.”
 “A significant portion of business aircraft passengers are technical specialists, managers and other company employees, as well as customers. These passengers spend an average of 63 percent of their time on board business aircraft engaged in work, compared to just 42 percent when traveling commercially.”

A research report from PWC produced in 2015, based on 2013 data, found:

 “Nationwide 255,000 full- and part-time workers were directly employed in general aviation in 2013…. Including indirect, induced, and enabled impacts, general aviation, in total, supported 1.1 million jobs and $219 billion in output.”
 “Overall, total GDP impact attributable to general aviation amounted to $346 per person in the United States in 2013. At the national level, each direct job in the general aviation industry supported 3.3 jobs elsewhere in the economy.”

NBAA conventions 
NBAA organizes conferences and seminars, as well as large-scale conventions, that focus on business aviation topics.

The 2018 NBAA-BACE Business Aviation Convention & Exhibition was held in Orlando, Florida drawing 23,000+ attendees and was ranked number 12 in overall size by Trade Show News Network for the year.

The 2017 NBAA-BACE Business Aviation Convention & Exhibition was ranked number 9 in net square footage for the United States. And NBAA-BACE has been a top-ten U.S. convention in square footage size for three years since 2015.  This convention attracts business aviation industry professionals, business aircraft owners and operators, aircraft manufacturers and buyers.

Prominent public officials attend NBAA conventions and are often presenters. Speaking at the NBAA Business Aviation Convention & Exhibition in Las Vegas, Nevada, on October 10, 2017, the Chairman of the United States National Transportation Safety Board, Robert L. Sumwalt, said: “I am absolutely convinced in the significant value of business aviation. I’ve seen it first-hand.”

Other conventions managed by NBAA include the annual ABACE and EBACE exhibitions.  The EBACE Convention, held in Geneva, Switzerland, is jointly hosted by NBAA and EBAA (the European Business Aviation Association). At the 2019 EBACE Convention, nearly half of the aircraft exhibited were powered by sustainable/alternative jet fuels, electricity or other sustainable propulsion. “Production and use of the alternate fuels are key to the industry’s Business Aviation Commitment on Climate Change, which, among other aims, seeks to achieve carbon neutral growth from 2020 forward.” Another focal topic at this event was urban air mobility (UAM), where prototype vehicles for electric-powered vertical take-off and landing (eVTOL) were exhibited.

At the EBACE event in 2018, more than 400 companies exhibited and approximately 50 business aircraft were displayed. At the 2018 EBACE Convention, Ed Bolen, President and CEO of NBAA said: “’EBACE once again showed that business aviation is an industry focused on innovation and investment in the future. The new aircraft models, the new business models, the featured speakers and the trends we discussed all point to an energetic industry looking toward tomorrow.’”

The 2019 ABACE Convention for business aviation professionals and customers in the Asia-Pacific region  was NBAA’s eighth edition, and its largest to-date for overall exhibition size.  The 2018 ABACE Convention, held in Shanghai, China, and jointly hosted with the Shanghai Airport Authority, had 170 exhibitors and 30 aircraft on display. At the 2018 ABACE Convention, Ed Bolen, President and CEO of NBAA said: “’Business aviation is becoming ever-more established in this region, with ABACE playing a pivotal role in its ongoing development.’”

NBAA leadership 
Edward M. Bolen has been the president and CEO of NBAA since September 7, 2004. The organization’s Board of Directors includes Chairman Lloyd Newton of L3 Technologies, Inc. and Vice Chair/Treasurer Elizabeth Dornak of DuPont Aviation.

Other NBAA board members include: Paul Anderson of UTFlight, William S. Ayer of Honeywell, Sheryl Barden of Aviation Personnel International, Shelly deZevallos of Independent Mortgage Company, Todd Duncan of Duncan Aviation, Ronald Duncan of General Communications, David Everitt of Harsco Corporation, Milt Hobbs of JPMorgan Chase & Co, Monte J.M. Koch of Falconshare LLC, Mark McIntyre of Mente LLC, Jim Schwertner of Schwertner Farms, Rich Walsh of American Express, Dan Williams of Walmart, and John Witzig of Pfizer Inc.

Executive leaders of the organization include Steve Brown (Chief Operating Officer), Marc Freeman (Chief Financial Officer), Dan Hubbard (Senior Vice President, Communications), Chris Strong (Senior Vice President, Conventions & Membership), Dina Green (Vice President, Events), Linda Peters (Vice President, Exhibits), Dick Doubrava (Vice President, Government Affairs), Christa Lucas (Vice President, Government Affairs), Doug Carr (Vice President, Regulatory and International Affairs), Todd Wormington (Vice President, Technology & Security), Mike Nichols (Senior Vice President, Strategy & Innovation), and Jo Damato (Vice President, Educational Strategy & Workforce Development).

NBAA Meritorious Service to Aviation Award 
The NBAA Meritorious Service to Aviation Award is an American award in aviation given annually since 1950 by the NBAA.

The Association states that the award is business aviation's most distinguished honor, recognizing extraordinary lifelong professional contributions to aviation.

Past winners include:
Senator Barry M. Goldwater
William P. Lear Sr.
Juan Trippe
Henry B. Du Pont
Lt. Gen. James H. Doolittle
Eddie Rickenbacker
Charles Lindbergh
Arthur Godfrey
Allen E. Paulson

References

External links 
 

Aviation in the United States
Organizations established in 1947
1947 establishments in Washington, D.C.
Non-profit organizations based in Washington, D.C.